Lake Olmstead Stadium is a baseball park in Augusta, Georgia, United States. It was built between the 1994 and 1995 seasons to replace Heaton Stadium on the same site and can hold 4,822 people. The stadium also serves as an outdoor-arena style event venue.

Lake Olmstead Stadium was primarily used as the home field of the Augusta GreenJackets of the Class A South Atlantic League from 1995 to 2017, after which the GreenJackets moved to the new SRP Park across the Savannah River in North Augusta, South Carolina, in 2018.

Lake Olmstead Stadium was the home field of the Augusta University Jaguars baseball team for most of their games  from 2009 to 2013 and all of their games from 2014 to 2018; however, the team elected to return to Jaguar Field on the Forest Hills campus full-time starting in the 2019 season.

Features
The stadium has nearly 1,000 box seats, 830 reserved seats and over 2,500 general admission seats. In 2006, the Budweiser Party Pavilion was built down the right field line. This new area can host picnics anywhere from 20 people to as many as 500 people.

Improvements
Before the 2007 season, the Cintas Cool Zone was constructed and the Fun Zone playground area down the left-field line was revamped.

Future
With the GreenJackets' departure, the Augusta-Richmond County commission faces questions on how to utilize the ballpark. One proposal was leaving the ballpark as-is with Augusta University as the primary tenant while another proposal was to renovate the ballpark into an amphitheater. In August 2018 it was reported that the issues hadn't been resolved yet, but that, regarding the interest of Augusta University or Paine College, "it doesn't look like that's the route we're going to take." In October 2018 Recreation officials recommended to city commissioners that they do modest repairs to the facility to begin holding events, short of a full-scale renovation estimated to cost $640,000.

Notable events
Bob Dylan performed at the stadium during his 2006 North American Tour on August 17, 2006.

References

External links
Augusta Greenjackets Profile
Lake Olmstead Stadium Views - Ball Parks of the Minor Leagues

Minor league baseball venues
Sports venues in Augusta, Georgia
Baseball venues in Georgia (U.S. state)
1995 establishments in Georgia (U.S. state)
Sports venues completed in 1995